The Republican Union Party (PUR) was a Spanish republican party founded in 1903 by Nicolás Salmerón y Alonso.

It participated in the 1903, 1905 and 1907 general elections. It was dissolved in 1910, being succeeded by the Republican Nationalist Federal Union.

See also 
 Republican Union (Spain, 1893)
 Republican Union (Spain, 1934)

References 

Defunct political parties in Spain
Political parties established in 1903
Political parties disestablished in 1910
Radical parties
Republican parties in Spain
Restoration (Spain)
1903 establishments in Spain
1910 disestablishments in Spain